The Great White Throne is a monolith, predominantly composed of white Navajo Sandstone in Zion National Park in Washington County in southwestern Utah, United States. It is often used as a symbol of Zion National Park. The Great White Throne can be seen from most locations along the scenic drive running through Zion Canyon.

Naming

The Great White Throne was named by the Methodist minister of Ogden, Utah, Frederick Vining Fisher, in 1916.  On a trip up the canyon with Claud Hirschi, Fisher and Hirschi named many features in Zion Canyon.  Later afternoon light gloriously lit up The Great White Throne, prompting Fischer to state:

Climbing regulations
A bivouac permit is required from the park visitor center for any climbs expected to last overnight.

Climate

Spring and fall are the most favorable seasons to visit The Great White Throne. According to the Köppen climate classification system, it is located in a Cold semi-arid climate zone, which is defined by the coldest month having an average mean temperature below 32 °F (0 °C), and at least 50% of the total annual precipitation being received during the spring and summer.

See also

 Geology of the Zion and Kolob canyons area
 Colorado Plateau
 List of mountains in Utah

References

External links

 Great White Throne on SummitPost.org
 Zion National Park National Park Service
 Weather forecast

Mountains of Utah
Zion National Park
Mountains of Washington County, Utah